The 2001 American Handball Women's Youth Championships took place in São Bernardo do Campo from September 26 – 30.

Results

Final standing

References 
 brasilhandebol.com.br 

2001 in handball
Pan American Women's Youth Handball Championship
2001 in youth sport